Oplothecium is a genus of fungi in the family Trichosphaeriaceae.

References 

Sordariomycetes genera
Trichosphaeriales